St. Paul's Methodist Episcopal Church (St. Paul's United Methodist Church) is a historic church at 40 School Street in Point Arena, California, United States.  It was built in a Gothic Revival style and was added to the National Register of Historic Places in 1990.

It is a one-story building with a T-shaped gable roof.

References

Churches in Mendocino County, California
Carpenter Gothic church buildings in California
United Methodist churches in California
Churches on the National Register of Historic Places in California
National Register of Historic Places in Mendocino County, California